Atwood–Rawlins County City–County Airport  is a public airport located two miles (3 km) north of the central business district of Atwood, in Rawlins County, Kansas, United States. It is owned by the City of Atwood & Rawlins County.

Although most U.S. airports use the same three-letter location identifier for the FAA and IATA, Atwood–Rawlins County City–County Airport is assigned ADT by the FAA but has no designation from the IATA.

Facilities and aircraft 
For the 12-month period ending June 9, 2006, the airport had 12,300 aircraft operations, an average of 33 per day: 98% general aviation and 2% air taxi.

References

External links 

Airports in Kansas
Buildings and structures in Rawlins County, Kansas
County airports in Kansas